Hewett is a surname. Notable people with the surname include:
Adrian Paul Hewett (born 1959), British actor, director, and philanthropist
Alfie Hewett (born 1997), British wheelchair tennis player
Ben Hewett (born 1978), Australian actor and television presenter
Charles Thomas Hewett, South Australian explorer and politician
Christopher Hewett (1921–2001), British actor and theatre director
Colleen Hewett (born 1950), Australian actress and singer
Cornwallis Hewett (1787–1841), Royal Physician and Downing Professor of Medicine
Dave Hewett (born 1971), New Zealand rugby union player
Dorothy Hewett (1923–2002), Australian poet, novelist and playwright
Edgar Lee Hewett (1865–1946), American archaeologist and anthropologist
George Hewett (1750 - 1840), British army general
Rear Admiral George Hayley Hewett (1855–1930), Royal Navy Admiral
Herbie Hewett (1864–1921), English cricketer
Howard Hewett (born 1955), American singer
Ivan Hewett, British music journalist
Rev. John Hewett (1830–1911), British priest
Sir John Prescott Hewett (1854–1941), British Member of Parliament and Colonial administrator
Rev. John Short Hewett (1781–1835), British academic and priest
Lauren Hewett (born 1981), Australian actress
Sir Prescott Gardner Hewett, 1st Baronet (1812–1891), Royal Physician
William Nathan Wrighte Hewett (1834–1888), English Royal Navy admiral and Victoria Cross recipient

See also
Hewitt (name)